Clavariadelphus truncatus is a species of mushroom. The common name of the species is truncated club or club coral. It is a member of the basidiomycete fungi family Gomphaceae.

Description
The species has a yellow-orange fruiting body in the shape of a club with a flat cap. The flesh is white, thin, and hollow at the top. The vertical side of the fruiting body normally has folds and wrinkles, but can be smooth. The spores are smooth and their spore print is pale yellow to ochre.

The mushroom has a pleasant odor and a sweet taste.

Similar species 
Although one field guide says that it is unlikely that anyone would confuse the mushroom with another species, the yellow chanterelle is distantly related to the mushroom and looks nearly the same, except for the ridges and cross-veined hymenium. Clavariadelphus pistillaris is also similar, but the top is not flat.

Habitat
The mushroom's habitat is in coniferous forests from summer to autumn. The mushroom is a common species. The species is found at a high elevation and is widely distributed. C. truncatus can bioaccumulate significant amounts of zinc, and radioactive caesium-137.

Edibility
The mushroom is edible and has a sweet taste. Old mushrooms may be spongy and soft inside. The species is high in nutrition and can be used for cooking. One field guide says that the mushroom is one of the best to eat and has a sweet flavor that is especially appealing to some people. David Arora writes that the mushroom can be sauteed and served for dessert.

Medicinal uses
The mushroom contains clavaric acid, which has been shown to reduce the rate of tumor development when given to mice. Clavaric acid interferes with farnesyltransferase, an enzyme implicated in tumorigenesis, which suggests that clavaric acid may have therapeutic value in the treatment of certain cancers. It has been reported that mushrooms have significant antioxidant activity.

See also
 Medicinal mushrooms

References

External links
Healing-mushrooms.net Image & description of bioactive properties

Edible fungi
Medicinal fungi
Fungi of North America
Taxa named by Lucien Quélet